Chrysura cuprea is a species of cuckoo wasps (insects in the family Chrysididae).

Description
Body is almost entirely metallic golden-red, only the sides of the rear part of the chest and the legs are metallic bluish.

Biology
Chrysura cuprea fly from May to July. The larvae live as parasites of larvae of Osmia species.

Distribution
These quite uncommon wasps can be found in the area of Southern and Central Europe and in North Africa.

Habitat
They prefer temperature-favored regions with little vegetation, especially dry grasslands and rocky slopes.

Bibliography
 Heiko Bellmann: Bienen, Wespen, Ameisen. Hautflügler Mitteleuropas. Franckh-Kosmos Verlags-GmbH & Co KG, Stuttgart 1995, .

References 

Chrysidinae
Hymenoptera of Africa
Hymenoptera of Europe
Insects described in 1790
Taxa named by Pietro Rossi